Barton Abbey is a privately owned house in Oxfordshire, England located in the parish of Steeple Barton. Parts of the building date from the 16th Century but the majority of the structure is Victorian.

References

Buildings and structures in Oxfordshire
West Oxfordshire District